Jiří Doležal (born 22 September 1963) is a Czech former ice hockey player. He competed in the men's tournaments at the 1988 Winter Olympics and the 1994 Winter Olympics.

His sons Jiří Jr and Tomáš also played hockey professionally (both were forwards and played for HC Slavia Praha, where their father had ended his playing career and was also employed on the coaching staff).

Career statistics

Regular season and playoffs

International

References

1963 births
HC Slavia Praha players
HC Sparta Praha players
Ice hockey players at the 1988 Winter Olympics
Ice hockey players at the 1994 Winter Olympics
Living people
Olympic ice hockey players of Czechoslovakia
Olympic ice hockey players of the Czech Republic
Ice hockey people from Prague
Czechoslovak expatriate sportspeople in Finland
Czechoslovak expatriate ice hockey people
Czech expatriate ice hockey players in Germany
Czech expatriate ice hockey players in Finland
JYP Jyväskylä players
Nürnberg Ice Tigers players
Czech ice hockey forwards
Czechoslovak ice hockey forwards
Czech ice hockey coaches